The Chevaliers is a 1994 Taiwanese television drama series produced by Young Pei-pei, first aired on Taiwan Television. Produced in conjunction with Hong Kong's TVB, it's believed to be the Taiwanese drama starring the most number of Hong Kong stars, like Damian Lau, Alex Man, Cecilia Yip, Maggie Shiu, Margie Tseng, Lau Dan, Eddie Kwan, and Lawrence Ng.

Like its main rival The Seven Heroes and Five Gallants produced by Chinese Television System, it was also (very loosely) based on the 19th-century novel The Seven Heroes and Five Gallants. As a result in June and July 1994, Taiwanese prime-time audiences could switch TV channels and still watch the same non-fictional characters like Zhan Zhao, Bai Yutang and Prince of Xiangyang portrayed by different actors.

Cast
Tang Chih-wei as Emperor Renzong of Song
Sally Chen as Empress Dowager Liu
Damian Lau as Zhan Zhao
Alex Man as Ouyang Chun
Chiang Kuei-pei as Lu Fang
Cheng Ping-chun as Han Zhang
Kan Ti-men as Xu Qing
Lee Ya-ming as Jiang Ping
Chang Chen-huan as Bai Yutang
Chang Shih as Zhi Hua
Hsieh Tsu-wu as Ai Hu
Chiang Ming as Eighth Prince
Lau Dan as Prince of Xiangyang
Lawrence Ng as Zhao Shouqian, son of Prince of Xiangyang
Cecilia Yip
Maggie Shiu

Soundtrack

The lyricist for Track 5, Liu Yong is a famous 11th-century poet. The TV series is also set in 11th-century Song dynasty.

Television shows based on The Seven Heroes and Five Gallants
Mandarin-language television shows
1994 Taiwanese television series debuts
1994 Taiwanese television series endings
Taiwan Television original programming